The 2023 V.League 2, known as the Gold Star V.League 2 for sponsorship reasons, will be the 29th season of V. League 2, Vietnam's second tier professional football league. The season is scheduled to commence on 7 April 2023.

Changes from the previous season

Withdrawn clubs
On February 14, 2023, both Saigon and Can Tho all announced not to attend 2023 V.League 2 due to financial reasons. Saigon have sold their spot in the league to Lam Dong before subsequently dissolving. However, Saigon said that their facilities and professional work have not met the conditions, not guaranteeing long-term progress so Saigon have been dissolved while Lam Dong still play in the Vietnamese Football League Second Division. Meanwhile, Can Tho will play in the Vietnamese Football League Third Division from the 2023–24 season.

Prize money
1st place: 1 billion VND (42643 USD) ==> 2 billion VND (85286 USD)
2nd place: 500 million VND (21321 USD) ==> 1 billion VND (42643 USD)
3rd place: 250 million VND (10660 USD) ==> 500 million VND (21321 USD)

Name change
Pho Hien FC changed their name to PVF-Cong An Nhan Dan FC on 22 February 2023.

Participating clubs by province

Personnel and kits

Managerial changes

League table

Results

Position by round

Attendances to stadium

References

External links

V.League 2
2023 in Vietnamese football